Richard H. Young was an English footballer who made one appearance as a left half for Southend United in the Football League. He also played for Grays Thurrock.

References

Sportspeople from Southend-on-Sea
English footballers
Grays Thurrock United F.C. players
Southend United F.C. players
English Football League players
Year of birth missing
Year of death missing
Association football midfielders